Schlossberg is a World Cup technical ski course in Austria on Lienz Dolomites above Lienz, Tyrol, the race course debuted in 1969. It is part of Hochstein Ski Resort.

It is being exchanged with the course in Semmering, Austria on every two years since 1997. Events here have never yet been cancelled.

World Cup 

This course hosted total of 28 World Cup events for women (16th of all-time) and 3 World Cup events for men (70th of all-time).

Men

Women

Course sections
 SCL Kante, Russenweg, Gamsgangl, Jasdorferschuß, Bärental, Gribelekante, Schibrücke, Schlußhang

References

External links
FIS Alpine Ski World Cup – Lienz, Austria 
Ski-db.com - Lienz men's races

Ski areas in Austria